Neuquén – Plottier – Cipolletti is an Agglomeration in Argentina that joins the cities of Neuquén, Cipolletti and Plottier, on the provinces of Neuquén and Río Negro. the settlement is on the Confluence between the rivers Limay and Neuquén, forming the río Negro (black river), this zone is known as Comahue and is the most important settlement of population in Patagonia.

Population 

In 2001 the population was 291,041, an increase of 19.4% over the 243,803 inhabitants in 1991. This rapid demographic growth leveled off in the mid 1990s. At the last census, Neuquén – Plottier – Cipolletti was the 14th largest agglomeration in Argentina, having passed Bahía Blanca during the 1990s. Agriculture is the main economic activity of the region.

Geography 

Neuquén – Plottier – Cipolletti is located in the valley of the rivers Neuquén and Limay, denominated Alto Valle. The north of the Neuquén city is lying over the río Neuquén, and the south over Limay; Plottier is very close to the south of Limay river; and, Cipolletti lying at the left of Neuquén river.

Populated places in Neuquén Province
Populated places in Río Negro Province
Neuquén
Geography of Río Negro Province
Geography of Neuquén Province